The Prule Bridge or the Brickmakers' Bridge is a bridge crossing the Ljubljanica River in Ljubljana, the capital of Slovenia. It is located in the Trnovo District to the south of the Ljubljana old town and links the residential districts of Prule (Janežič Street; Slovene: Janežičeva cesta) and Trnovo (Brickmakers' Street; Slovene: Opekarska cesta). It is shaped like a wide platform on two columns with lookout balconies and with wide pavements, covered with red brick.

The first bridge at the site was a wooden one, previously used as the St. Peter's Bridge, and transferred here around 1918. On the left bank, Jože Plečnik embellished the otherwise insignificant bridge with three poplars. The current bridge was built in 1993 upon the plans by Peter Gabrijelčič. It is a compromise between the city government that wanted to build a four-lane bridge and residents who wanted a footbridge.

References

Bridges in Ljubljana
Bridges over the Ljubljanica
Road bridges in Slovenia
Trnovo District
Bridges completed in 1993
20th-century architecture in Slovenia